Franciszek Sobkowiak (3 October 1914 – 30 October 1942) was a Polish footballer, who was killed in World War II. He played in one match for the Poland national football team in 1938. His football club was Warta Poznan.

World War II
Sobkowiak was a Flight Sergeant serving in the Royal Air Force's 138 Squadron on a S.O.E. mission to drop arms and Polish agents to the underground Polish Home Army when he was killed on the night of 29/30 October 1942. When the plane he piloted failed to rendezvous with its reception party he flew home for RAF Tempsford via German-occupied Norway when it was shot down and crashed with loss of all hands. Initially buried 4 miles north west of Ogka, he was reburied in a collective grave at Oslo Western Civil Cemetery in 1953.

References

External links
 

1914 births
1942 deaths
Polish footballers
Poland international footballers
Polish military personnel killed in World War II
Place of birth missing
Association footballers not categorized by position
Polish Royal Air Force pilots of World War II
Royal Air Force airmen
Royal Air Force personnel killed in World War II
Burials at Vestre gravlund
Warta Poznań players